"Volvamos" is the second single from the third studio album by Mexican actress, singer and songwriter Dulce María. The single is a collaboration with the Panamanian singer Joey Montana, who was also the composer of that song with Andrés Saavedra. It was released on September 23, 2016. The song has urban rhythms and influences in reggaeton and Latin pop.

The song reached number one on iTunes in 13 countries.

Music video 
On October 15, 2016, Dulce María announced on their social networks, with a teaser, the release date of the video. It was released worldwide on October 18, 2016 by Ritmoson Latino and on October 19, 2016 on the singer's Vevo channel. This is about a couple who ended their relationship but feel like coming back.

The video was well received, it reached number one on iTunes in 13 countries.

Charts

Year-end charts

References

2016 songs
2016 singles
Spanish-language songs
Joey Montana songs
Dulce María songs